Banthi Poola Janaki is a 2016 Indian Telugu comedy thriller film  directed by Nellutla Praveen Chander. It was produced by  Kalyani-Ram under Ujwala Creations. The film features Dhanraj and Diksha Panth in the lead roles and supported by actors from the popular comedy show Jabardasth.

Plot

Janaki is an actress who gets a national award for her latest film Banthipoola Janaki. To celebrate her award, the film's hero Akash, writer Miriyalu, producer Bangarayya and director Ahamkaram plan to surprise Janaki. They gang up at a bungalow and begin their celebrations. In a shocking twist, they all die accidentally in the hands of Janaki. The rest of the story is all about how Janaki escapes from these murders with the help of her friend and manager Shyam.

Cast
 Dhanraj as Shyam, Janaki's Manager
 Diksha Panth as Janaki, Film Actress
 Chammak Chandra as Ahamkaram, Film Director
 Sudigali Sudheer as Akash, An actor (Hero)
 Rocket Raghava as Miriyalu, Film Writer
 Shakalaka Shankar
 Bharath Reddy
 Raghu Karumanchi as Bangarayya, Film Producer

Production

Casting
The majority of the actors are from the popular TV show Jabardasth.

Filming
The film was formally launched in Hyderabad on 10 February 2016. The entire film was completed in single schedule.

Release
After clearing the censor it was awarded  'U/A' Certificate from the CBFC and was released on 26 August 2016.

Marketing
Title logo of the film was launched on 18 January 2016 by Malayalam Super star Mohanlal. The film's theatrical trailer was released on 21 May 2016.

Soundtrack

The music was composed by Bhole and all the songs were written by Kasarla Shyam. Music released on Mango Music Company. Audio launch event of the movie was held at Shilpakala Vedika, Hyderabad on  29 July 2016. Actor Ram attended the audio launch function as chief guest and released the audio CD. Regina, Sampoornesh Babu, Tanish, Nandini Reddy and other prominent cast and crew of the film graced the event .

Reception
123telugu.com gave the film 2.25 stars out of 5 and called it a "boring thriller". Indiaglitz.com  gave the film 1.5 stars out of 5.

References

External links 
 

2016 films
2010s Telugu-language films
Films shot in Telangana